The Communist Party of Great Britain is a political group which publishes the Weekly Worker newspaper. The CPGB (PCC) claims to have "an internationalist duty to uphold the principle, 'One state, one party'. To the extent that the European Union becomes a state then that necessitates EU-wide trade unions and a Communist Party of the EU". In addition, it is in favour of the unification of the entire working class under a new Communist International. It is not to be confused with the former Communist Party of Great Britain, the Communist Party of Great Britain (Marxist–Leninist), or the current Communist Party of Britain.

Formation 

The origins of the CPGB (PCC) lie in the New Communist Party of Britain (NCP) which split from the Communist Party of Great Britain (CPGB) in 1977. Under the influence of a faction of the Communist Party of Turkey, a handful led by NCP youth section leader John Chamberlain (who uses the pseudonym Jack Conrad) attempted to rejoin the then CPGB.

Few actually regained party cards but the grouping began to publish The Leninist, first as a journal, then as a more or less monthly paper. Initially The Leninist appeared to some to be a Stalinist publication in its politics, but over time it mutated into something very different. This may be due to their interaction with various Trotskyist groups including a series of exchanges with the Spartacist League. The faction developed a critique of the Stalinist states as well as the bureaucratism and political liquidationism of the old CPGB.

Post-CPGB dissolution 
After the dissolution of the official CPGB in 1991 and its relaunch as the Democratic Left, the group declared their intention to reforge the party on what they declared to be "firm Leninist principles". They organised an "emergency conference", at which they claimed the CPGB name, but not its assets. They also changed the name of their paper, increasing its regularity to weekly.

By the early 1990s the group was working closely with the tiny Trotskyist Revolutionary Democratic Group and the discussion magazine Open Polemic. It also sought to deepen its links with a group of recent ex-members of other Trotskyist groups such as the Socialist Workers Party who called themselves the International Socialist Group. The CPGB (PCC) described this process as "Communist rapprochement". The attempt failed as the ISG collapsed and Open Polemic briefly enrolled a few of its supporters in the CPGB (PCC), only for them to quit in a row over money.

During the 1992 general election campaign, Ken Livingstone claimed that the members of the CPGB (PCC) were "MI5 agents".

In 1999, the group stood candidates for two UK constituencies in the European elections. Prevented from using the CPGB name it stood as 'Weekly Worker'.

Activities 
The group was for a short while embedded in the Socialist Labour Party, but left to join the Socialist Alliance in which they came to work closely with the Alliance for Workers' Liberty and proposed a merger of their papers, rejected by the AWL. The two have since politically drifted apart.

In 2004, the group affiliated to the Respect Coalition. A minority disagreed with the tactic of working within Respect and formed a faction called the Red Platform. The new faction called instead for the CPGB (PCC) to rejoin a Socialist Alliance reform current called the Socialist Alliance Democracy Platform. The Red Platform won their aim but the CPGB (PCC) majority continued to work within Respect. Members of the Red Platform subsequently left to create the Red Party in August 2004 over a disagreement about their views being published in the paper.

The group was active in the Campaign for a Marxist Party (2006–2008) and is critical of the Campaign for a New Workers' Party and the Convention of the Left. The CPGB (PCC) was heavily involved in founding the Hands Off the People of Iran (HOPI) campaign. Mark Fischer, formerly National Organiser of the CPGB (PCC), is HOPI secretary. The CPGB (PCC) also enjoys close links with Communist Students.

The CPGB (PCC) endorsed the Labour Party in the June 2009 European Parliament elections and criticised the No to EU – Yes to Democracy coalition as "left-wing nationalist".

Non-members such as former Soviet dissident Boris Kagarlitsky, Matzpen founder Moshé Machover and Professor Hillel Ticktin, editor of Critique and chairman of the Centre for the Study of Socialist Theory and Movements, University of Glasgow, have spoken at CPGB (PCC) events.

Campaign for a Marxist Party 
The Campaign for a Marxist Party was a campaign (founded 4 November 2006) run by the CPGB-PCC and other organisations on the British left for a political party with explicitly Marxist goals as part of a rebuilt workers' international. Its members were Critique (who proposed the campaign initially), CPGB (PCC) and the Democratic Socialist Alliance. The Irish Socialist Democracy group welcomed the CPGB (PCC). Similar socialist campaign groups include Campaign for a New Workers' Party and Convention of the Left.

The campaign agreed three founding political principles at the founding conference:
 We are in favour of a planned, democratic socialist society and against the market.
 Socialism will be achieved in a single step when the working class seizes power over society, there are no intermediate "democratic" or other stages
 The Campaign is against the destructive incubus of Stalinism and will seek to make clear the counter revolutionary and anti-human nature of the Stalinist regimes and Parties. Stalinism was responsible for mass slaughter, brutal incarceration and the atomisation of the people of the countries under its control. In addition the Stalinists were responsible for the most cynical and costly betrayals of the working class everywhere from Germany to South Africa – no Party which has as its aim the liberation of humanity can do other than condemn the Stalinist current and seek to undo the damage done to Marxism by it.

Its seven-member executive mainly consisted of members of the CPGB (PCC) and the Democratic Socialist Alliance criticised the party for its "hijacking" of the campaign. A group of members became known as the Trotskyist Tendency. The campaign published Marxist Voice.

In November 2008, it was announced that the CPGB (PCC) would move to wind up the campaign at its December AGM. Having done so, it claimed it will establish a new committee to promote "unity of Marxists as Marxists". A minority of members objected to the dissolution of the campaign including in published articles by Dave Spencer, Phil Sharpe and Steve Freeman.

Communist Platform of Left Unity 
In 2013, the CPGB (PCC) intervened in the campaign for a new left party initiated by film director Ken Loach. They accused the campaign's initial appeal of making "Keynesian platitudes" and called for a new formation on the left to have an explicitly Marxist programme. The CPGB (PCC) described the "politically decrepit" Socialist Resistance as "the one 'insider' group" in the campaign and accused the group of attempting "to relive old Labour-style Keynesian welfarism".

In the run up to the Left Unity (LU) founding conference in November 2013, the CPGB (PCC) launched the Communist Platform in response to the Socialist Platform "[obscuring] the differences between Marxism and a left reading of clause four-type politics". They launched the Communist Platform as a permanent tendency in Left Unity on 8 February 2014. On 29 March 2014, CPGB member Yassamine Mather was elected to Left Unity's National Council at the party's first policy conference.

In February 2016, the CPGB (PCC) dissolved their Platform and left LU.

Labour Party 
In 2015, the CPGB (PCC) supported Jeremy Corbyn in his successful campaign to be elected leader of the Labour Party. The CPGB (PCC) has been a supporter of Labour Party Marxists (LPM), which promotes many of the ideas of the Weekly Worker to a Labour Party audience through its website and occasional print bulletins. Stan Keable, secretary of Labour Party Marxists, was expelled from the Labour Party in June 2017 for his association with LPM. The CPGB (PCC) has also promoted the work of another Labour Party organisation, Labour against the witch-hunt, in the Weekly Worker. In 2020, the CPGB (PCC) suffered the resignation of a number of members around its work in the Labour Left Alliance. The leadership of the CPGB (PCC) have argued that this was due to a departure from communist principle on the part of those members; this has been strongly rejected by the leadership's internal critics.

Communist University 
Every year the CPGB (PCC) organises a weeklong summer school called Communist University. They invite speakers from in- and outside the CPGB (PCC) to discuss a range of topics. Amongst the regular speakers are Scottish computer scientist Paul Cockshott, Iranian scholar and activist Yassamine Mather and a founder of the Israeli socialist organisation Matzpen, Moshé Machover. Recurring themes, amongst others, are international politics, the Israeli-Palestinian conflict and the Labour Party.

Policies 
The party has been involved in a rethinking of the class nature of the former Soviet Union. Despite its origins in the New Communist Party of Britain, The Leninist advanced sharp criticisms of the Soviet Union and the Eastern Bloc countries while strongly opposing movements it considered to be in support of capitalism. Today, leading member Jack Conrad calls these societies forms of "bureaucratic socialism" in a view strongly influenced by Hillel Ticktin and the Critique journal while Mike Macnair argues that the Soviet Union was a peasant based society frozen in transition from feudalism to capitalism. However, the CPGB (PCC) does not formally endorse any particular theoretical analysis of the Soviet Union.

During the Kosovo War of the late 1990s, the party supported the ethnic-Albanian Kosovo Liberation Army (KLA) and supports the complete secession of Kosovo from Serbia. The party refers to the Serbian province as Kosova, the Albanian and Ottoman Turkish name for Kosovo.

The party formerly listed the abolition of the age of consent among its immediate demands, with alternative legislation to protect children from sexual abuse. In 2021 it amended this demand: "Young people are entitled to develop their sexual lives free from parental, police or religious control. We favour legislation which protects children and young people from sexual exploitation by those who are substantially older than them, especially by those in authority over them."

International 
The CPGB (PCC) has informal ties with the Dutch Communist Platform, which shares a similar political point of view. Members of the Communist Platform have visited the CPGB's Communist University in the past.

References

External links 
 Communist Party of Great Britain (Provisional Central Committee)
 Weekly Worker archive

1991 establishments in the United Kingdom
Communist parties in the United Kingdom
Communist Party of Great Britain
Political parties established in 1991
Communist Party of Great Britain breakaway groups
Anti-austerity political parties in the United Kingdom
Far-left politics in the United Kingdom